A privet is a flowering plant in the genus Ligustrum. The genus contains about 50 species of erect, deciduous or evergreen shrubs, sometimes forming small or medium-sized trees, native to Europe, north Africa, Asia, many introduced and naturalised in Australasia, where only one species, Ligustrum australianum, extends as a native into Queensland. Some species have become widely naturalized or invasive where introduced. Privet was originally the name for the European semi-evergreen shrub Ligustrum vulgare, and later also for the more reliably evergreen Ligustrum ovalifolium and its hybrid Ligustrum × ibolium used extensively for privacy hedging, though now the name is applied to all members of the genus. The generic name was applied by Pliny the Elder (23–79 AD) to L. vulgare. It is often suggested that the name privet is related to private, but the OED states that there is no evidence to support this.

Description
Privet is a group of shrubs and small trees of southern and eastern Asia, from the Himalayas extending into Australia. They may be evergreen or deciduous, and are tolerant of different soil types. They often have conspicuous heads of white flowers followed by black berries.

Uses and cultivation
In addition to being cultivated to create ornamental hedges and foliage, privet is also widely used in horticulture and flower arrangements. The oval leaf privet Ligustrum ovalifolium is used for hedges, while its flexible twigs are sometimes used as cords for lashing. The tree species, especially Chinese privet is frequently used as a street tree in Europe, while other species including Ligustrum japonicum and Ligustrum quihoui are among the others also sometimes used as ornamental plants in gardens.
Privet became very popular in Britain as a replacement for ornamental railings around properties, which had been lost to the 1941 Government compulsorily requisitioning of all post-1850 iron gates and railings for the war effort the idea being that the donated metal would be melted down for use in the manufacture of armaments in WWII, although this ultimately did not happen. The remaining stubs of sawn-off railings can still be seen on many garden walls in the UK, often partly obscured by privet bushes.

Chinese privet is used in traditional herbal medicine. The decoction of privet leaves or bark helps to treat diarrhea, stomach ulcers, chronic bowel problems, chapped lips, sore mouths and throats, and a wash for skin problems. Privet leaves and bark have bitter properties that make a useful tea for improving appetite and digestion in chemotherapy patients.  Kuding is a Chinese tea made from either a Ligustrum or Ilex species.

Some species produce a fruit, which is mildly toxic to humans. Symptoms from eating privet fruit include nausea, headache, abdominal pain, vomiting, diarrhea, weakness, low blood pressure, and low body temperature. At least some privet species are known to be toxic to horses.

Ecology
A plant may produce thousands of fruits, most of which are eaten by birds.
Privet is used as a food plant by the larvae of some Lepidoptera species including the common emerald, common marbled carpet, copper underwing, engrailed, mottled beauty, scalloped hazel, small angle shades, v-pug, privet hawk moth and willow beauty.

Invasiveness

Privet is a successful invasive species because of its ability to outcompete and therefore displace native vegetation, due to its adaptability. Various species are now a problem in North America, Australia and New Zealand.

Selected species
The Integrated Taxonomic Information System lists eleven "accepted" species of Ligustrum. Additional species are listed in other references.

Ligustrum amamianum (China)
Ligustrum amurense (Northern China) – Amur privet
Ligustrum angustum (China)
Ligustrum australianum (Wet Tropics, NE. & C. Qld, Australia) – Australian privet
Ligustrum chenaultii (Yunnan Province, China)
Ligustrum compactum (Himalayas, southwest China)
Ligustrum confusum (Himalayas, Khasi Hills, Vietnam)
Ligustrum delavayanum (Southwest China, Myanmar)
Ligustrum expansum (China)
Ligustrum glomeratum (Thailand, Malaysia)
Ligustrum gracile (China)
Ligustrum henryi (Central China)
Ligustrum ibota (Japan)
Ligustrum indicum (Himalayas, Indochina)
Ligustrum japonicum (Japan, Korea) Japanese privet
Ligustrum leucanthum (China)
Ligustrum lianum (China)
Ligustrum liukiuense (Taiwan)
Ligustrum longitubum (China)
Ligustrum lucidum (China, Japan, Korea, Vietnam) - Chinese privet, glossy privet 
Ligustrum massalongianum (Himalayas)
Ligustrum micranthum (the Bonin Islands, the Volcano Islands)
Ligustrum microcarpum (Taiwan); often included in L. sinense.
Ligustrum morrisonense (Taiwan)
Ligustrum obovatilimbum (China)
Ligustrum obtusifolium (East Asia) – Japanese deciduous privet 
Ligustrum ovalifolium (Japan) – Korean privet, oval-leaved privet 
Ligustrum pedunculare (China)
Ligustrum pricei (Taiwan, Vietnam)
Ligustrum punctifolium
Ligustrum quihoui (China)
Ligustrum retusum (China)
Ligustrum robustum (India to Vietnam)
Ligustrum sempervirens (Western China)
Ligustrum sinense (China, Taiwan, Vietnam)  – Chinese privet 
Ligustrum strongylophyllum (Central China)
Ligustrum tenuipes. (China)
Ligustrum tschonoskii (Japan)
Ligustrum vulgare (Europe, northwest Africa, southwest Asia) – common privet, European privet
Ligustrum xingrenense (China)
Ligustrum yunguiense (China)

References

 
Garden plants
Taxa named by Carl Linnaeus